The water polo competitions at the 2019 Southeast Asian Games took place at the New Clark City Aquatics Center, New Clark City, Capas, Tarlac, Philippines. It was one of four aquatic sports at the Games, along with diving, swimming, and open water swimming. The 2019 Games featured one water polo competition each for men's teams and women's teams.

Participating nations
A total of 101 athletes from 5 nations participated (the numbers of athletes are shown in parentheses). The Filipino, Singaporean and Thai teams entered both the men's and women's competition. All other teams played in men's tournament.

Competition schedule
The following is the schedule for the water polo competitions. Men's teams go through a single round robin tournament, while women's teams go through a double round robin tournament.

Medal summary

Medal table

Medalists

Men's competition

The tournament featured 5 countries. The format was the same as 2017; there was a group of five with round-robin format. The top three of group received medals.

Round-robin

Women's competition

This tournament featured only 3 countries, unlike the 2017 edition, where there were 5 countries who participated.

Double round-robin

References

External links
 

 
2019
Southeast Asian Games
2019 Southeast Asian Games events